Ernest Pascal Noble (died October 17, 2017) was Pike Professor of Alcohol Studies, University of California, Los Angeles. He also served as the director of the National Institute on Alcohol Abuse and Alcoholism from 1976 to 1978.

With Sujata Tewari he demonstrated that chronic alcohol consumption inhibits protein metabolism in the brains of mice.

He was awarded a Guggenheim fellowship in 1974.

References

American biochemists
2017 deaths
Year of birth missing
David Geffen School of Medicine at UCLA faculty
Researchers in alcohol abuse
National Institutes of Health people